Sven Beckert is Laird Bell Professor of American History at Harvard University, where he teaches  the history of the United States in the nineteenth century, and global history. With Christine A. Desan, he is the co-director of the Program on the Study of Capitalism at Harvard University.

He was an American Council of Learned Societies Fellow in 2008. He was a Freiburg Institute for Advanced Studies Fellow.
He was a New York Public Library Fellow.
He is a Guggenheim Fellow.

Education 
He studied history, economics and political science at the University of Hamburg, Germany and then graduated from Columbia University with a PhD in History.

Career 
In 2003, Beckert worked at the University of Konstanz as a Humboldt Research Fellow.

Works
He is the author of Empire of Cotton: A Global History (2014), which won the 2015 Bancroft Prize and was a finalist for the 2015 Pulitzer Prize for History. The New York Times called it "one of the ten best books of 2015." Economic historian Peer Vries wrote that it was "a must read for every historian interested in global history, but in my view it is better as a story on cotton than as an analysis of capitalism." Other economic historians have criticized the book.

Comaroff petition

In February 2022, Beckert was one of 38 Harvard faculty to sign an open letter published in The Harvard Crimson defending Professor John Comaroff after a university investigation found that he had violated the Harvard's sexual and professional conduct policies. The letter stated, in part, that "We the undersigned know John Comaroff to be an excellent colleague, advisor, and committed university citizen.” Four days later, after three graduate students filed a lawsuit with detailed allegations of Comaroff's actions and the university's failure to respond, Beckert was one of several signatories to say that they wished to retract their signatures.

Books

Journal articles

Edited volumes

References

External links

"Beckert tracks cotton trail", Harvard Gazette,

Living people
Columbia Graduate School of Arts and Sciences alumni
Harvard University faculty
University of Hamburg alumni
21st-century American historians
21st-century American male writers
Year of birth missing (living people)
Bancroft Prize winners
American male non-fiction writers